Vittorio Cecchi Gori (born 27 April 1942) is an Italian film producer and politician. 
He pleaded guilty to bankruptcy and was sentenced in February 2020 to 8 years and 5 months of imprisonment.

Born in Florence, Italy he is the son of Mario Cecchi Gori. He has produced numerous films, most notably Il Postino: The Postman (1994), which received an Academy Award nomination for Best Picture and Life Is Beautiful (1997) which received an Academy Award for Best Foreign Language Film.

He was also senator from the Italian People's Party.

He owned the football club A.C. Fiorentina from 1993 to 2002, as well as the private television channel La7. On 3 June 2008, he was arrested in Rome for bankruptcy and on 25 July 2011 again.

References

External links

Profile at Italian Senate

1942 births
Italian football chairmen and investors
ACF Fiorentina chairmen and investors
Italian film producers
Living people
Film people from Florence
Members of the Senate of the Republic (Italy)
David di Donatello Career Award winners
Nastro d'Argento winners
Filmmakers who won the Best Foreign Language Film BAFTA Award
Politicians from Florence